Tony Wong (born Wong Chi-wah; December 12, 1948 – June 17, 2009) was a politician in Ontario, Canada. He was a Liberal member of the Legislative Assembly of Ontario from 2003 to 2006 representing the Greater Toronto Area riding of Markham. He was a municipal councillor for the city of Markham from 1997 to 2004 and served as a York Region Councillor from 2006 to 2009.

Background
Wong was born in Hong Kong and he studied at the Diocesan Boys' School. He received a Bachelor's degree in math from the University of Toronto and Master's in computer science from the University of Missouri. He was a lawyer (University of Toronto) and founding director of the Metropolitan Toronto Southeast Asian Legal Clinic. He was a partner in his own practice, Wong and Chun. He served as a board member of the Markham Stouffville Hospital Foundation, the St. John's Rehabilitation Hospital Foundation and the York Region Police Services Board. He is cousin of Toronto City Councillor Cynthia Lai.

Politics
In 1997 Wong, ran for the municipal council in Markham, Ontario. He received 1,406 votes defeating his nearest rival by 774 votes. In the 2000 election, he was elected as one of four regional councillors.  He was a leading figure in calling for reconciliation between the city's Chinese and Muslim communities in 1999, after a controversy concerning the construction of a local mosque. In 2003, he spoke against an attempt by the government of China to enact "anti-subversion" legislation in Hong Kong (many recent Chinese immigrants in Markham have dual Canadian/Hong Kong citizenship).

In the 2003 provincial election, he contested Markham for the Liberal Party against David Tsubouchi, a prominent cabinet minister in the Progressive Conservative governments of Mike Harris and Ernie Eves.  Markham had been represented by the Progressive Conservative Party since its creation in 1987, and it was anticipated that Tsubouchi would be re-elected despite a strong provincial swing to the Liberals; instead, Wong defeated him by 5,996 votes.  Wong acknowledged that his candidacy benefited from a large ethnic Chinese immigrant population in the riding.

The Liberals won the provincial election, and Wong was subsequently named parliamentary assistant to Joseph Cordiano, the Minister of Economic Development and Trade.

Not long after his election, Wong held a benefit dinner for the daughters of Geng Chaohui, a recent Chinese immigrant to Canada who committed suicide because of underemployment. The event raised $30,000, although it was little reported outside of the Chinese-language press.

On September 25, 2006, Wong resigned his seat in the legislature to run for York Regional Council. He won one of four seats in November 2006. He served in council until March 2009 and took a leave of absence. Wong was expected to return to council in September.

Wong died of liver failure on June 17, 2009 at Sunnybrook Health Sciences Centre in Toronto. He is survived by his wife Ellee and his daughter Daphne.

Notes

References

External links

1948 births
2009 deaths
Hong Kong emigrants to Canada
Lawyers in Ontario
Naturalized citizens of Canada
Ontario Liberal Party MPPs
Ontario municipal councillors
People from the Regional Municipality of York
Canadian politicians of Hong Kong descent
University of Missouri alumni
University of San Diego alumni
University of Toronto alumni
21st-century Canadian politicians
Canadian politicians of Chinese descent